Cricula is a genus of moths in the family Saturniidae first described by Francis Walker in 1855.

Species
Cricula agria Jordan, 1909
Cricula andamanica Jordan, 1909
Cricula andrei Jordan, 1909
Cricula australosinica Brechlin, 2004
Cricula australovietnama Brechlin, 2010
Cricula bornea Watson, 1913
Cricula cameronensis U. & L. Paukstadt, 1998
Cricula ceylonica Jordan, 1909
Cricula elaezia Jordan, 1909
Cricula elaezioborneensis Brechlin, 2010
Cricula elaeziopahangensis Brechlin, 2010
Cricula elaeziosumatrana Brechlin, 2010
Cricula flavoglena Chu & Wang, 1993
Cricula hainanensis Brechlin, 2004
Cricula hayatiae U. Paukstadt & Suhardjono, 1992
Cricula jordani Bryk, 1944
Cricula kalimantanensis Brechlin, 2010
Cricula kransi Jurriaanse & Lindemans, 1920
Cricula luzonica Jordan, 1909
Cricula mindanaensis Naessig & Treadaway, 1997
Cricula palawanica Brechlin, 2001
Cricula quinquefenestrata Roepke, 1940
Cricula sichuana Brechlin, 2010
Cricula sumatrensis Jordan, 1939
Cricula tonkintrifenestratoides Brechlin, 2010
Cricula trifenestrata (Helfer, 1837)
Cricula trifenestratoides Brechlin, 2010
Cricula vietnama Brechlin, Naessig & Naumann, 1999
Cricula zubsiana Naessig, 1985

References

Saturniinae